Sturges v Bridgman (1879) LR 11 Ch D 852 is a landmark case in nuisance decided by the Court of Appeal of England and Wales. It decides that what constitutes reasonable use of one's property depends on the character of the locality and that it is no defence that the plaintiff "came to the nuisance".

Facts
A doctor moved next door to a confectioner, who had produced sweets for sale in his kitchen for many years. The doctor constructed a small shed for the purpose of private practice. He built the shed on the boundary. However, the loud noises from the confectioner's industrial mortars and pestles could be clearly heard, disrupting his use and enjoyment of his land. He sought an injunction. The facts were described by Thesiger LJ in the Court of Appeal as follows,

Judgment
The Court of Appeal held that the fact the doctor had "come to the nuisance", by which the Judge meant moved to an area where the nuisance had been operating for years without harming anyone, was no defence. The doctor's legal right to have the nuisance stopped was not lessened by the confectioner's longstanding practice. The text of Thesiger LJ's judgment follows.

See also
Robinson v Kilvert (1889) LR 41 ChD 88

References
 
  Where he argues the case was decided on poor grounds from an economic point of view.

1879 in case law
1879 in British law
Court of Appeal (England and Wales) cases
English nuisance cases
English tort case law